The 2017 Chicago Sky season was the franchise's 12th season in the Women's National Basketball Association (WNBA).  The Sky started the season slowly, posting a 1–5 record in May.  This slow start continued into June where the team only won 2 of 9 games.  The team showed improvement in July and August, posting a combined record of 9–8 in those months.  An 0–2 September saw the Sky finish with an overall record of 12–22.  The Sky finished in 4th place in the Eastern Conference, ahead of the Atlanta Dream via tiebreaker.  The team did not qualify for the playoffs.

Transactions

WNBA Draft

The Sky made the following selections in the 2017 WNBA draft:

Trades
  Elena Delle Donne is traded to the Washington Mystics in exchange for Stefanie Dolson, Kahleah Copper and Washington’s first round pick (second overall) in the 2017 WNBA draft.
 Astou Ndour was acquired from the San Antonio Stars, in exchange for Clarissa Dos Santos.
 Keisha Hampton was acquired from the Minnesota Lynx. in exchange for Chantel Osahor.

Roster

Preseason

|- bgcolor="ffcccc"
| 1 || May 26:00 PM || Connecticut || L 72-81  || Hampton/Young (11) || Breland (8) || Epps (5) || Mohegan Sun Arena2782 || 0-1
|-  bgcolor="bbffbb"
| 2 || May 34:00 PM || New York || W 86-75 || Pondexter (15) || Parker (6) || Breland (3) || Mohegan Sun Arena || 1-1
|-

Regular season

Game log

|- style="background:#fcc;"
| 1 || May 146:00 PM || Minnesota || L 61–70 || Sylvia Fowles (26) || Sylvia Fowles (10) || Augustus, Whalen (5) || Xcel Energy Center9,234  || 0–1
|- style="background:#fcc;"
| 2 || May 197:30 PM || Atlanta || L 83–91 || Cappie Pondexter (22) || Jessica Breland (7) || Cappie Pondexter (7) || Allstate Arena6,631 || 0–2
|- style="background:#bbffbb"
| 3 || May 212:00 PM || Atlanta || W 75–71 || Stefanie Dolson (23) || Jessica Breland (12) || Cappie Pondexter (11) || McCamish Pavilion4,859 || 1–2
|- style="background:#fcc;"
| 4 || May 2411:30 AM || Washington ||L 82-67 || Cappie Pondexter (17) || Stefanie Dolson (11) || Cappie Pondexter (10) || Allstate Arena6,714 || 1-3
|- style="background:#fcc;"
| 5 || May 266:00 PM || Washington || L 88-79 || Quigley (17) || Pondexter (6), Breland (6) || Pondexter (8) || Verizon Center  6,438 || 1-4	 
|- style="background:#fcc;"
| 6 || May 285:00 PM || Connecticut || L 97-79 || Young (17) || Breland (11) || Pondexter (9) || Allstate Arena  4,498 || 1-5

|- style="background:#fcc;"
| 7 || June 17:00 PM
|| Phoenix || L 99-91 || Dolson (21) || Boyette (9) || Pondexter (8) || Allstate Arena  4,634 || 1-6
|- style="background:#fcc;"
| 8 || June 69:30 PM || Los Angeles || L 79-70 || Vandersloot (13) || Boyette (9) || Vandersloot; Quigley (5) || Staples Center  8,523 || 1-7
|- style="background:#bbffbb"
| 9 || June 107:00 PM || San Antonio || W 85-81 (OT) || Dolson (25) || Dolson (9) || Pondexter (6) || AT&T Center  6,191 || 2-7
|- style="background:#fcc;"
| 10 || June 169:00 PM || Phoenix || L 86-78 || Quigley (19) || Bpyette (10) || Quigley (6) || Talking Stick Resort Arena  10,249 || 2-8
|- style="background:#fcc;"
| 11 || June 185:00 PM || Indiana || L 91-79 || Quigley (18) || Boyette (10) || Quigley (6) || Allstate Arena  4,551 || 2-9
|- style="background:#bbffbb"
| 12 || June 236:30 PM || Atlanta || W 82-78 || Quigley (22) || Dolson (8) || Pondexter (9) || McCamish Pavilion  4,237 || 3-9
|- style="background:#fcc;"
| 13 || June 255:00 PM || Washington || L 97-63 || Quigley (18) || Young (5) || Vandersloot; Young (3) || Allstate Arena  5,344 || 3-10
|- style="background:#fcc;"
| 14 || June 2811:30 AM || Indiana || L 82-75 || Breland (22) || Boyette (10) || Vandersloot (8) || Allstate Arena  10,197 || 3-11
|- style="background:#fcc;"
| 15 || June 307:00 PM || San Antonio || L 89-82 || Quigley (27) || Vandersloot; Boyette (4) || Vandersloot (9) || AT&T Center  4,942 || 3-12

|- style="background:#bbffbb;"
| 16 || July 87:00 PM
|| Minnesota || W 100-76 || Vandersloot (26) || Vandersloot (7) || Vandersloot (13) || Allstate Arena  6,942 || 4-12
|- style="background:#bbffbb;"
| 17 || July 1211:30 AM || Dallas || W 90-84 || Quigley (22) || Breland (12) || Vandersloot (12) || Allstate Arena  14,102 || 5-12
|- style="background:#bbffbb;"
| 18 || July 146:30 PM || New York || W 78-68 || Dolson (23) || Young (7) || Vandersloot (9) || Madison Square Garden  9,341 || 6-12
|- style="background:#fcc;"
| 19 || July 163:30 PM || Dallas || L 112-106 (2OT) || Dolson (26) || Dolson (10) || Vandersloot (10) || College Park Center  3,693 || 6-13
|- style="background:#bbffbb;"
| 20 || July 188:00 PM || Seattle || W 94-83 || Quigley (25) || Dolson (8) || Vandersloot (6) || KeyArena  8,358 || 7-13
|- style="background:#bbffbb;"
| 21 || July 20 || Los Angeles || W 82-80 || Dolson (15) || Young; Breland (7) || Vandersloot (14) || Staples Center  16,166 || 8-13
|- style="background:#fcc;"
| 22 || July 25 || Connecticut || L 93-72 || Quigley (20) || Dolson (7) || Young; Vandersloot (5) || Mohegan Sun Arena  5,631 || 8-14
|- style="background:#fcc;"
| 23 || July 28 || Phoenix || L 86-80 || Dolson (29) || Breland (12) || Vandersloot (10) || Allstate Arena  6,088 || 8-15
|- style="background:#fcc;"
| 24 || July 30 || New York || L 82-86 || Quigley (22) || Breland (10) || Vandersloot (10) || Allstate Arena  5,834 || 8-16
 

|- style="background:#bbffbb;"
| 25 || August 4 || Indiana || W 81-70 || Vandersloot (5) || Breland (8) || Vandersloot (10) || Bankers Life Fieldhouse 8,052 || 9-16
|- style="background:#bbffbb;"
| 26 || August 5 || Atlanta || W 91-86 || Vandersloot (26) || Vandersloot (7) || Vandersloot (10) || Allstate Arena  5,757 || 10-16
|- style="background:#bbffbb;"
| 27 || August 10 || San Antonio || W 94-74 || Vandersloot (21) || Breland (7) || Vandersloot (10) || Allstate Arena  4,686 || 11-16
|-style="background:#fcc;"
| 28 || August 18 || Los Angeles || L 106-115 || Quigley (26) || Dolson (10) || Vandersloot (12) || Allstate Arena  6,826 || 11-17
|- style="background:#fcc;"
| 29 || August 20 || Seattle || L 66-103 || Dolson (10) || Breland (9) || Vandersloot (6) || Allstate Arena  6,020 || 11-18
|- style="background:#bbffbb;"
| 30 || August 25 || Connecticut || W 96-83 || Breland (15) ||  Dolson (9) || Vandersloot (12) || Mohegan Sun Arena7,761 || 12-18 
|- style="background:#fcc;"
| 31 || August 27 || New York || L 62-92 || Dolson (22) || Bulgak (5) || Pondexter (6) || Madison Square Garden9,317 || 12-19
|- style="background:#fcc;"
| 32 || August 30 || Dallas || L 96-99 || Quigley (25) || Breland (8) || Vandersloot (12) || Allstate Arena  5,896 || 12-20

|- style="background:#fcc;"
| 33 || September 1 || Minnesota || L 87-110 || Copper (21) || Dolson (10) || Vandersloot (9) || Xcel Energy Center  9,709 || 12-21
|- style="background:#fcc;"
| 34 || September 3 || Seattle || L 80-85 || Copper (18) || Dolson (8) || Vandersloot (8) || Allstate Arena  7,199|| 12-22

Standings

Awards and honors

References

Footnotes

Notes

Chicago Sky seasons
Chicago
2017 in sports in Illinois